Nights in France is the fifth album by Australian group Flash and the Pan, released in 1987. Three singles were released from the album, "Ayla", "Money Don't Lie" and "Yesterday's Gone".

7" edits exist of all three singles. The 12" version of "Money Don't Lie" is longer than the single edit but simply an edit of the album version. "Ayla" was released in two extended versions available on 12" and CD singles - the "Disco Mix" and the "Outta Town Mix" (dub version). The 7" and CD single also featured a non-album b-side currently not available on any other release, "Your Love is Strange". "Yesterday's Gone" was also released as an extended version. All four extended versions are included on the 2012 double CD compilation The 12 Inch Mixes. The single edits of "Ayla" and "Money Don't Lie" have been included on several compilations including Collection and Ayla - The Best of Flash and the Pan. However, all CDs containing "Yesterday's Gone" opt for the album version.

"Ayla" was a sizable hit single in Germany (staying in the Top 100 for fifteen weeks and peaking at #26) and the Netherlands (#39).

Track listing
All songs written by Harry Vanda and George Young.

Personnel

Musicians
 Harry Vanda - lead guitar, vocals, keyboards
 George Young - lead vocals, keyboards, guitars
 Warren Morgan - keyboards
 Ronnie Peel - bass
 James Young - drums

*Unknown - saxophone on "Saviour Man"

Production
 Harry Vanda - Producer
 George Young - Producer
 Sam Horsburgh Jnr. - Engineer

1987 albums
Flash and the Pan albums
Albert Productions albums
Albums produced by Harry Vanda
Albums produced by George Young (rock musician)